The Vehicle is the fifth studio album by American musician Marcella Detroit, released in April 2013 under Right Recordings.

Background 
After signing with European printed music publisher Music Sales Group, Detroit was paired with producer Larry Klein to work on Detroit's first studio album since Dancing Madly Sideways in 2001, which resulted in the creation of the album Skin I'm In, which is currently due for release in 2014. During these sessions, Klein took a six-month break from production. Detroit felt she "didn't want to stop", and in 16 days self-produced The Vehicle, which she describes as her "pet project". Following this, Klein and Detroit completed work on Skin I'm In. After "a longtime friend" played The Vehicle for Universal-based record label Right Recordings, Detroit was signed to the label, under whom the album was released in April 2013. The album's lead single, "Good Girl Down" was released on the same day as the album, with the title track being released as the second single in September 2013. As of November 2013, Detroit is also working on her autobiography, also titled "The Vehicle".

Track listing

References 

2013 albums
Marcella Detroit albums